Dendropsophus schubarti (known as Schubart's Rondonia Treefrog) is a species of frog in the family Hylidae.
It is found in Bolivia, Brazil and Peru.
Its natural habitats are subtropical or tropical moist lowland forests and swamps.

References

schubarti
Amphibians described in 1963
Taxonomy articles created by Polbot